Rita Davar (born 3 June 1935) is an Indian tennis player. She was the first Indian to reach the tennis Grand Slam finals. Davar lost to Fenny ten Bosch in the 1952 Junior-Girls Wimbledon Championship with the 5–7, 6–1, 7–5 scores. Her other tennis achievements include winning the North India Championship (1953), South India Championship (1954), National Championship (1954 and 1955), and the Indian Championship (1954 and 1955).

References 

1935 births
Living people
Indian female tennis players